Green Road National Secondary School, previously known as Green Road Secondary School (GRSS), is a public English medium secondary school in Kuching, the capital of the East Malaysian state of Sarawak.

History
In 1903, Charles Anthoni Johnson Brooke, the second White Rajah of Sarawak, founded a boys' school, called the 'Government Lay School', where Malays could be taught in the Malay language. Later, the name of the school was changed to 'James Brooke Malay School'. That school was moved to a new site in P. Ramlee Road, in 1930, and renamed 'Madrasah Melayu Sarawak'.

Due to the increasing number of students, Green Road Government Secondary School (the term 'government' was commonly left out in the name, hence the acronym GRSS) was built at Green Road. GRSS started in 1963 with its students consisting mainly of those from 'Madrasah Melayu'. GRSS was officially opened on 10 June 1965 by Abdul Aziz, the then Chief Secretary of The Ministry of Education, with 335 students and 25 teachers. With the passage of English as the medium of instruction (late 1970s), GRSS became known as Sekolah Menengah Kerajaan (SMK) Green Road. Later still, it became Sekolah Menengah Kebangsaan (SMK) Green Road.

School organisation
The school motto is May We Grow As One.

School magazine
Vol.50-Current (2014-current) : Shine In The Dark

Past Principals
 1965-1969 : Mr David G. Marriott
 1970-1978 : Dr. G.T. Sargunam
 1978-1979 (1st term) : Mr Zainal Abidin bin Mohd Yusuf
 1979-(2nd term) - end of 1979 : Datu' Dr. Hj Adi Badiozaman Tuah
 1980-1981 (June) : Mr Yong Vui Ying (Acting Principal)
 1981-(June) -1982 : Mr  Mohamad bin Haji Abdul Rahman
 1983-1990 : Mr Paul Ngui
 1990-2003: Mdm Hajah Halimah binti Haji Mohd. Sahari
 2004-2015: Encik Putit bin Haji Ped
 2016-2017 : Catherine Ritikos @ Fiziah Abdullah
 2017-2019: Abang Othman Bin Abang Masagus
 2019-2021: Ismail Bin Jaya
 2022-Present: Dr. Nazamud-din bin Alias

References

National secondary schools in Malaysia
Secondary schools in Sarawak
Buildings and structures in Kuching
Educational institutions established in 1964
1964 establishments in Malaysia
Secondary schools in Malaysia